Oliver Beirne (March 26, 1811 - April 21, 1888) was a landowner from West Virginia, one of the owner of the Old Sweet Springs resort, and sole heir to plantation millionaire John Burnside, of whom he was a longtime friend.

Early life
Oliver Beirne was born on March 26, 1811, the son of Andrew Beirne (1771–1845) and Eleanor "Ellen" Grey Keenan (1779–1824).

Career
Beirne partnered with John Burnside in a mercantile business established in New Orleans in 1837. Beirne retired from the mercantile business in 1847 and Burnside became a wealthy merchant, later owner of The Houmas plantation and another dozen plantations in Louisiana.

Back in West Virginia, Oliver Beirne became a landowner and postmaster of Sweet Springs, West Virginia, where he owned the Old Sweet Springs resort. Aside from the resort at Sweet Springs, all other properties still belong to his heirs.

Personal life
Oliver Beirne married Margaret Melinda Caperton (1812–1844) on August 2, 1831. His children were: John, Jane E., Elizabeth "Bettie" Miles (1835–1874) (who married William Porcher Miles), Andrew, Susan Robinson (1840–1871) (married Major Henry Robinson), Nancy (married first Samuel B. Parkman, killed at Antietam, second Emil von Ahlefeldt) and Alice.

John Burnside, his longtime friend from the time when they worked together in New Orleans, was a lifelong bachelor, and when he died on June 29, 1881, he left his entire estate, estimated 5 or 6 million dollars, to Oliver Beirne. When Beirne died Houmas House and the other plantations went to William Porcher Miles, Beirne's son-in-law.

External links

References

1811 births
1888 deaths
19th-century American landowners
West Virginia postmasters
19th-century American businesspeople
People from Monroe County, West Virginia
American hoteliers
Businesspeople from West Virginia
19th-century American merchants
American people of Irish descent
Burials in West Virginia